In antiquity, Oscheret (pagus Oscarensis, French pays d'Oscheret) was the pagus (country) of the Lingones in the lower valley and plain of the Ouche. In the Middle Ages, the same region was a county (comitatus) of the kingdom of Upper Burgundy and an archdeaconry of the diocese of Chalon-sur-Saône.

Count Anscar and his family emigrated to Italy in the late 880s and he became Margrave of Ivrea there.

History of Burgundy